Sigillaria is a genus of extinct, spore-bearing, arborescent lycophyte, known from the Carboniferous and Permian periods. It is related to the more famous Lepidodendron, and more distantly to modern qulllworts.

Fossil records
This genus is known in the fossil records from as early as the Middle Devonian or the Late Carboniferous period  but dwindled to extinction in the Early Permian period (age range: from 383.7 to 254.0 million years ago). Fossils are found in Great Britain, United States, Canada, China, Korea, Tanzania and Zimbabwe.

Species

Species within this genus include:

S.alveolaris Brongniart (1828)
S.barbata Weiss (1887)
S.bicostata Weiss (1887)
S.boblayi Brongniart (1828)
S.brardii Brongniart (1828)
S.cancriformis Weiss (1887)
S.cristata Sauveur (1848)
S.cumulata Weiss (1887)
S.davreuxii Brongniart (1828)
S.densifolia Brongniart (1836)
S.elegans Sternberg (1825)
S.elongata Brongniart (1824)
S.fossorum Weiss (1887)
S.hexagona Brongniart (1828)
S.loricata Weiss (1887)
S.mammiliaris Brongniart (1824)
S.menardi Brongniart (1828)
S.micaudi (Zeller (1886-1888)
S.monostigma Lesquereux (1866)
S.orbicularis Brongniart (1828)
S.ovata Sauveur (1848)
S.pachyderma Brongniart (1828)
S.principes Weiss (1881)
S.reticulata Lesquereux (1860)
S.rugosa Brongniart (1828)
S.saulii Brongniart (1836)
S.schotheimiana Brongniart (1836)
S.scutellata Brongniart (1822)
S.sillimanni Brongniart (1828)
S.tesselata Brongniart (1828)
S.transversalis Brongniart (1828)
S.trigona Sternberg (1826)
S.voltzii Brongniart (1828)

Description
Sigillaria was a tree-like plant reaching a height up to 30 meters, with a tall, single or occasionally forked trunk that lacked wood.  Support came from a layer of closely packed leaf bases just below the surface of the trunk, while the center was filled with pith. The long, thin grasslike leaves were attached directly to the stem and grew  in a spiral along the trunk. The old leaf bases expanded as the trunk grew in width, and left a diamond-shaped pattern, which is evident in fossils. These leaf scars were arranged in vertical rows. The trunk had photosynthetic tissue on the surface, meaning that it was probably green.

The trunk was topped with a plume of long, grass-like, microphyllous leaves, so that the plant looked somewhat like a tall, forked bottle brush. The plant bore its spores (not seeds) in cone-like structures  attached to the stem.

Sigillaria, like many ancient lycopods, had a relatively short life cycle - growing rapidly and reaching maturity in a few years. Some researchers have suggested that Sigillaria was monocarpic, meaning that it died after reproduction, though this is not proven. It was associated with Lepidodendron, the scale tree, in the Carboniferous coal swamps.

Gallery

Bibliography
 William A. DiMichele, Richard M. Bateman: The Rhizomorphic Lycopsids: A Case-Study in Paleobotanical Classification. Systematic Botany, 1996, Band 21, S. 535-552.
 Thomas N. Taylor, Edith L. Taylor, Michael Krings: Paleobotany. The Biology and Evolution of Fossil Plants. Second Edition, Academic Press 2009, . S. 303-307
 J. W. Sir Dawson - On the structure and affinities of Sigillaria, Calamites and Calamodendron - Paperback – August 16, 2011 
 Silva Pineda, A. (2003). "Flora del Pérmico de la región de Izúcar de Matamoros, Puebla". En Soto, L. A. Agustín Ayala-Castañares: universitario, impulsor de la investigación científica. UNAM. p. 371.

References

External links 

 Fossil Plants Vol.II
 The Columbia Encyclopedia

Prehistoric lycophytes
Prehistoric lycophyte genera
Pennsylvanian plants
Permian plants
Prehistoric trees
Carboniferous first appearances
Permian genus extinctions
Fossils of Georgia (U.S. state)
Paleozoic life of New Brunswick
Paleozoic life of Nova Scotia
Prehistoric plants of North America